Martin Johansson (born April 16, 1975) is a Swedish former professional ice hockey defenceman. He most notably played with IF Björklöven and Modo Hockey in the Swedish Hockey League (SHL).

Johansson made his Elitserien debut playing with IF Björklöven during the 1993–94 Elitserien season.

References

External links

1975 births
Living people
IF Björklöven players
Modo Hockey players
Skellefteå AIK players
Stavanger Oilers players
Swedish ice hockey defencemen
Swedish expatriate ice hockey players in Denmark
Sportspeople from Umeå